Gwen Sinethemba Amanda Ngwenya (born 7 September 1989), is a South African academic, politician and Head of Policy for the opposition Democratic Alliance. As a Member of Parliament for the Democratic Alliance in the Fifth Parliament, she served on the Standing Committee on Finance. She has also served as COO of the South African Institute of Race Relations, Africa's largest classically liberal think tank.

Early life and education

Ngwenya was born into a Zulu family in Durban on 7 September 1989. She attended St Mary's Diocesan School for Girls (DSG), a private boarding and day school for girls situated in the suburb of Kloof, and matriculated in 2007. She was a contemporary of Lindiwe Mazibuko who was also educated at the school. She holds a BA Degree in Law and Classical Studies from the University of Cape Town where she served as the president of the Student Representative's Council as a member of the Democratic Alliance Students' Organization (DASO) in 2011.

Ngwenya studied a Master's in International Economics from the University of Paris (Université Paris XII), where she wrote her thesis on Optimal Cartel Policy in India; she also enrolled for a Master's in Finance at the University of London.

Career

After completing her studies, Ngwenya worked as an economics researcher for a competition economics firm in New Delhi, India. Afterwards, she worked as an economist in the UK focusing on the pharmaceutical and airline industries. She was an accounts manager for international financial, software, data, and media company Bloomberg, before becoming chief operating officer for the South African Institute of Race Relations (IRR). After leaving her post at the IRR, she was sworn in as a Member of Parliament for the Democratic Alliance on 27 February 2018, serving as the party's Head of Policy.

She resigned as DA Head of Policy on 24 January 2019, citing her dissatisfaction with former DA leader Mmusi Maimane's lack of concern for policy. However, she remained a DA member. She is also a Member of the Council of the University of Stellenbosch. Ngwenya was the chief executive officer of Techpol, a specialised public affairs advisory.

In November 2019, it was speculated that Ngwenya would return to the DA. The party officially announced her appointment to her former post on 24 November 2019.

References

External links

1989 births
Living people
University of Cape Town alumni
University of Paris alumni
Alumni of the University of London
Democratic Alliance (South Africa) politicians